Skasen is a lake in the municipalities of Grue and Kongsvinger in Innlandet county, Norway.

See also
List of lakes in Norway

References

Grue, Norway
Kongsvinger
Lakes of Innlandet